This is a list of people who have served as Lord-Lieutenant of Kent. Since 1746, all Lords Lieutenant have also been Custos Rotulorum of Kent.

Lords Lieutenant of Kent
Sir Thomas Cheney 1551–?
William Brooke, 10th Baron Cobham 3 July 1585 – 6 March 1597
Henry Brooke, 11th Baron Cobham 29 October 1597 – 24 March 1603
Edward Wotton, 1st Baron Wotton 28 January 1604 – 31 May 1620
George Villiers, 1st Marquess of Buckingham 31 May 1620 – 8 June 1620
Ludovic Stuart, 2nd Duke of Lennox 8 June 1620 – 16 February 1624
Philip Herbert, 4th Earl of Pembroke 20 March 1624 – 1642
Interregnum
Heneage Finch, 3rd Earl of Winchilsea 10 July 1660 – 16 January 1688 jointly with
Thomas Wriothesley, 4th Earl of Southampton 16 July 1662 – 16 May 1667 and
Charles Stewart, 3rd Duke of Richmond 13 May 1668 – 12 December 1672
Christopher Roper, 5th Baron Teynham 16 January 1688 – 25 October 1688
Louis de Duras, 2nd Earl of Feversham 25 October 1688 – 17 May 1689
Heneage Finch, 3rd Earl of Winchilsea 17 May 1689 – 3 October 1689
Henry Sydney, 1st Earl of Romney 3 October 1689 – 8 April 1704 jointly with
Vere Fane, 4th Earl of Westmorland 18 April 1692 – 29 December 1693
Charles Finch, 4th Earl of Winchilsea 2 May 1704 – 6 April 1705
Lewis Watson, 1st Earl of Rockingham 6 April 1705 – 19 March 1724
John Sidney, 6th Earl of Leicester 3 June 1724 – 27 September 1737
Lewis Watson, 2nd Earl of Rockingham 17 November 1737 – 4 November 1745
Thomas Watson, 3rd Earl of Rockingham January 1746 – 26 February 1746
Lionel Sackville, 1st Duke of Dorset 8 July 1746 – 10 October 1765
Charles Sackville, 2nd Duke of Dorset 17 December 1765 – 5 January 1769
John Sackville, 3rd Duke of Dorset 27 January 1769 – 30 June 1797
Charles Marsham, 1st Earl of Romney 30 June 1797 – 9 June 1808
John Pratt, 1st Marquess Camden 9 June 1808 – 8 October 1840
Henry Tufton, 11th Earl of Thanet 16 November 1840 – 19 October 1846
George Cowper, 6th Earl Cowper 19 October 1846 – 15 April 1856
John Townshend, 1st Earl Sydney 10 June 1856 – 14 February 1890
Arthur Stanhope, 6th Earl Stanhope 18 March 1890 – 19 April 1905
John Pratt, 4th Marquess Camden 5 June 1905 – 14 December 1943
Wykeham Stanley Cornwallis, 2nd Baron Cornwallis 1 September 1944 – 1972
Gavin Astor, 2nd Baron Astor of Hever 2 August 1972 – 2 August 1982
Robert Leigh-Pemberton, Esquire 2 August 1982 – 23 January 2002
Allan Willett 23 January 2002 – 24 August 2011
Philip Sidney, 2nd Viscount De L’Isle 1 September 2011 - 21 April 2020
Annabel Rose Campbell, Baroness Colgrain 22 April 2020 -

Deputy Lieutenants

 Sir Thomas Peyton, 2nd Baronet; July 1660 to February 1684
 Ivo Francis Walter Bligh, 8th Earl of Darnley March 1901 
 Sir John Furley March 1901 
 Bill Cockcroft
 Kelvin Holford
 Jools Holland
 Sir Keith Speed
 John Astor, 3rd Baron Astor of Hever
 Patrick Tootal
 Colonel Michael Howard Seys-Phillips, April 1971 
 Honorary Colonel Frederick Kenneth Theobald, April 1971 
 Brigadier John Charles Holman CBE, April 1996
 Brigadier David John Ralls CBE DFC DL

Footnotes

References
 

Kent